Microsoft Dangerous Creatures is a discontinued educational programme by Microsoft Home.  It was designed for Windows 3.1 and first published in August 1994. It was included in the "Microsoft Home bundle pack" along with 'Encarta', 'Works Multimedia', Money and 'Arcade & Best of Windows Entertainment Pack'.

Gameplay
Dangerous Creatures allowed the user to investigate animals according to several categories: Atlas (animals by country), Weapons (animals that had teeth, venom, or claws), Guides (related animals), Habitats (animals from a given environment), and Index (an alphabetical list of all animals covered).  Animal articles had pictures, descriptions, and video clips. In addition a user could be tested with quizzes on the animals.

Narration and Video
Most pictures were taken from websites and books (e.g. Dorling Kindersley).  Narration was done by three different people.  The main narrator is Robert Zink, who also does the guide 'Fergus', and the other two guides are done by Cindy Shrieve and Annette Romano (Tawny and Safara).  The original music was done by Bill Birney.  The videos are mostly from BBC, National Geographic, Second Line Search, Al Giddings, Bayer, Anglia TV, Oxford, Archive Films, and F. Juhos Productions.

References

External links
Microsoft Dangerous Creatures at WinWorld

1994 software
Dangerous Creatures
Educational software for Windows